The Organisation of Women of African and Asian Descent (OWAAD) was an activist organisation for British Black and Asian women established in 1978, with founder members including Stella Dadzie, Olive Morris, and Gail Lewis. It has been called "a watershed in the history of Black women's rights activism".

OWAAD was a broadly socialist, non-hierarchical national umbrella organisation. It held four annual conferences from 1979 to 1982, the first leading to black women's groups being formed nationwide. OWAAD held a sit-in at Heathrow Airport to protest virginity tests being carried out on Asian female immigrants to test their residency and marriage claims.

OWAAD disbanded in 1982 for a variety of reasons.

See also 
 Southall Black Sisters

References

Further reading 

 "Black Women Organizing", Feminist Review 17, 84–89 (1 November 1984)

External links 

 OWAAD

1978 establishments in the United Kingdom
1982 disestablishments in the United Kingdom
Anti-racist organisations in the United Kingdom
Asian-British culture
Black feminist organizations
Black British culture
Defunct organisations based in the United Kingdom
Ethnic organisations based in the United Kingdom
Organizations disestablished in 1982
Organizations established in 1978
Organizations for women of color
Socialism in the United Kingdom
Socialist organisations in the United Kingdom
Women's organisations based in the United Kingdom
Black British history